Šēdere Parish is an administrative territory of Augšdaugava Municipality in the Selonia region of Latvia.
It was established under the 1920 land reform, and was previously known as Laši parish. It is situated on the southern border with Lithuania.

  - parish administrative center

See also 
 Pašulienes mežs Nature Reserve 
 Raudas meži Nature Reserve

References

External links

Parishes of Latvia
Augšdaugava Municipality
Selonia